James, Jim, and Jimmy Parker may refer to:

Arts and entertainment 
James Cutler Dunn Parker (1828–1916), American musician
James Ervan Parker (born 1942), American singer-songwriter
James Stewart Parker (1941–1988), English playwright and writer
Jim Parker (composer) (born 1934), British composer

Military 
James Parker (Medal of Honor) (1854–1934), United States Army major general
James P. Parker (1855–1942), United States Navy commodore

Politics 
James Parker (judge) (1803–1852), British vice-chancellor, father of the rower James Parker
James Parker (British politician) (1863–1948), British Labour politician, Member of Parliament for Halifax
James Parker, Irish general, see Irish Defence Forces Chief of Staff 
James Parker (Massachusetts politician) (1768–1837), United States Congressman from Massachusetts
James Parker (New Jersey politician) (1776–1868), United States Congressman from New Jersey
James Aubrey Parker (born 1937), U.S. federal judge 
James S. Parker (1867–1933), United States Congressman from New York
James Augustus Parker (1820–1899), member of the Queensland Legislative Assembly

Religion 
James Parker (cement maker) (fl. 1791–1797), British clergyman and cement maker, the inventor of "Roman" cement
James Parker (priest) (born 1932), American priest of the Anglican and later Roman Catholic Church

Sports 
James Parker (handballer) (born 1994), Argentine handballer
James Parker (rower) (fl. 1842–1863), English rower, son of the judge James Parker
James Parker (rugby league) (fl. 1912–1919), New Zealand rugby league player
James Parker (rugby union), New Zealand rugby union player; see List of New Zealand national rugby union players
James Parker (tennis), American tennis player of the 1960s; see 1965 Wimbledon Championships – Men's Singles
James "Quick" Parker (1958–2018), Canadian Football League player
Jim Parker (American football) (1934–2005), American professional football player
Jim Parker (footballer) (fl. 1905–1913), English footballer
James Parker (hammer thrower) (born 1975), American hammer thrower
Red Parker (Jimmy  Parker, 1931–2016), college football coach
Jamie Parker (cricketer) (born 1980), English cricketer

Others 
James Parker (publisher) (1714–1770), colonial American printer and publisher
James W. Parker (1797–1864), Texas settler
James Parker (art historian) (1924–2001), curator of European Sculpture and Decorative Arts at the Metropolitan Museum of Art
James A. Parker (foreign service officer) (1922–1994), African-American foreign service officer
James Benjamin Parker (1857–1907), American noted for attempting to stop the assassination of president William McKinley
Jim Parker (rugby union) (1897–1980), New Zealand soldier, sportsman and businessman
James Wentworth Parker (1886–1957), American mechanical engineer
James Vanderburgh Parker (1830–1917), American heir and social leader

See also 
Jamie Parker (born 1979), English actor and singer
Jamie Parker (politician), Australian Greens politician